Sydney William Templeman, Baron Templeman, MBE, PC (3 March 1920 – 4 June 2014) was a British judge. He served as a Lord of Appeal in Ordinary from 1982 to 1995.

Early life and career
Templeman was born on 3 March 1920, the son of Herbert William Templeman (a coal merchant) & his wife Lilian née Pheasant. He was educated at Southall Grammar School and St John's College, Cambridge, where he was a scholar and read History. His studies were interrupted by World War II. In 1941, he was commissioned into the 4 Gorkha Rifles, and saw action on the Northwest Frontier, at Arakan, Imphal, and Burma. For his wartime service, he was mentioned in dispatches, and was demobilised as an honorary Major, and then later appointed an MBE for his war service.

After the War, he returned to Cambridge to finish his studies, and read Law. He was called to the bar by the Middle Temple, where he was a Harmsworth Scholar, but joined Lincoln's Inn ad eundem as a MacMahon Scholar. He also practiced at the Chancery bar. One notable case which he worked on was Anisminic v Foreign Compensation Commission in which he was counsel for the respondents, the Foreign Compensation Commission.

Templeman became a member of the Bar Council in 1961, and was made a Queen's Counsel in 1964. He was elected a Bencher of the Middle Temple in 1969. He was Attorney-General of the Duchy of Lancaster between 1970 and 1972.

Judicial career
Templeman was appointed to the High Court and assigned to the Chancery Division in 1972, and received the customary knighthood. He was subsequently appointed a Lord Justice of Appeal in 1978, and was sworn into the Privy Council. Sitting at first instance in EMI Limited v Pandit [1975] 1 All ER 418, he granted the first Anton Piller order in English legal history.

On 30 September 1982, Templeman was made a Lord of Appeal in Ordinary and created a life peer under the Appellate Jurisdiction Act 1876, taking the title Baron Templeman, of White Lackington in the County of Somerset.

Lord Templeman made significant contributions to English law during his time as a judge, both within and outside his specialist field of tax law and intellectual property law. He gave leading speeches upholding orthodox doctrine against calls for reform in the important land law cases of Prudential Assurance Co Ltd v London Residuary Body [1992] 2 AC 386 and Rhone v Stephens [1994] 2 AC 310.  He also sponsored the Land Registration Act 1988, which led to the land register of England and Wales being open to the public for the first time in 1990.

Revenue cases
Templeman is famous for paving the way for later judges to combat tax avoidance. He is famous for the concept of "Sham Transactions" introduced in the case of Black Nominees Ltd v Nicol (Inspector of Taxes). This case (which concerned an avoidance scheme adopted by the advisers of the actress Julie Christie) was groundbreaking as for the first time, judges were able to depart from the controversial Duke of Westminster Doctrine. Consequently, the business/commercial motive of a transaction conducted by a taxpayer would be considered. Notwithstanding this he was also famous for being a supporter of the Ramsay Doctrine and was notable for writing a scathing public letter (in retirement) to Lord Hoffman for wanting to move away from the Ramsay Principle in the Ramsay case. Ironically, during his time at the bar he had been active in advising on tax mitigation schemes for his clients, although this may have helped formulate his later views on the bench.

Social views
Templeman also handed down a number of judgments which were very socially conservative.  In  when considering whether injuries inflicted during sadomasochistic sex with the consent of all parties was legal, he said: "Society is entitled and bound to protect itself against a cult of violence. Pleasure derived from the infliction of pain is an evil thing. Cruelty is uncivilised."  Templeman was also one of the dissenting judges in the famous case of Gillick v West Norfolk and Wisbech AHA [1986] AC 112, arguing, inter alia, that sub-16-year-old girls should not be having sex and, therefore, cannot legally consent to being prescribed contraceptives by a physician (thus necessitating parental consent to obtain prescription contraceptives).

Other significant cases, in which Lord Templeman appeared, were the Spycatcher case (relating to the duty of confidentiality and the Official Secrecy Act) and dismissing the claims of the mother of Jacqueline Hill, the last victim of the Peter Sutcliffe (the "Yorkshire Ripper"), against the police for failing to apprehend the killer before he murdered her.

Judicial style
During his time on the bench, Lord Templeman was known to be short with counsel who persisted with a line of argument after he had made up his mind, which earned him the affectionate sobriquet, "Syd Vicious".

Lord Templeman was also renowned for his colourful language. In Borden (UK) Ltd v Scottish Timber Products Ltd [1979] 3 WLR 672 at 686 he remarked:"At some distant date, when the court has unearthed the unearthable, traced the untraceable and calculated the incalculable, there will emerge the sum, which it is said belongs to the plaintiffs in equity. This sum, which is immune from the claims of Crown and mortgagee, debenture holder and creditor, a sum secured to the plaintiffs by a simple retention of title clause, which referred only to resin but was pregnant with all the consequences alleged in the statement of claim and hidden from the gaze of all other persons who dealt with the defendants."

When he expressed judicial opinions - either on legal or social issues - he often did so in strident tones.  In , he referred to bribery as an "evil practice which threatens the foundations of any civilised society".  In Hazell v Hammersmith and Fulham LBC [1992] 2 AC 1 when counsel tried to rely upon the decision in Sutton's Hospital Case (1612) 10 Co Rep 1 he said: "This argument strikes me as being not so much arcane as absurd."

However, he was also capable of striking a deeply compassionate note.  Whilst dismissing the claim of Anita Hill's mother for the murder of her daughter, he said: "The appellant, Mrs. Hill, is tormented with the unshakeable belief that her daughter would be alive today if the respondent the West Yorkshire police force had been more efficient. That belief is entitled to respect and understanding. Damages cannot compensate for the brutal extinction of a young life."

Personal

Templeman was an active freemason.

Family
Lord Templeman had two sons, Peter (a Church of England vicar) and Michael (a barrister).

Death
Lord Templeman died on 4 June 2014.

Arms

Notable cases
Anisminic v Foreign Compensation Commission [1969] 2 AC 147
Black Nominees Ltd v Nicol [1975] TR 93; [1975] STC 372
EMI Limited v Pandit [1975] 1 All ER 418
Mandla v Dowell-Lee [1983] 2 AC 548
Street v Mountford [1985] AC 809
Gillick v West Norfolk Area Health Authority [1985] AC 112
Miles v Wakefield Metropolitan District Council [1987] AC 539
China and South Sea Bank v Tan [1990] 1 AC 536
Lipkin Gorman v Karpnale Ltd [1991] 3 WLR 10
Prudential Assurance Co Ltd v London Residuary Body [1992] 2 AC 386
R v Brown [1994] 1 AC 212
Attorney General for Hong Kong v Reid [1994] 1 AC 324, [1994] 1 NZLR 1 (PC)

References

1920 births
2014 deaths
Law lords 
20th-century English judges
Alumni of St John's College, Cambridge
Members of the Privy Council of the United Kingdom
Templeton, Sydney
Members of the Judicial Committee of the Privy Council
Knights Bachelor
Attorneys-General of the Duchy of Lancaster
Freemasons of the United Grand Lodge of England
Chancery Division judges
Indian Army personnel of World War II
Royal Gurkha Rifles officers